Trundle Island is an island lying 1 nautical mile (1.9 km) northeast of Jingle Island, Pitt Islands, in the Biscoe Islands. Photographed by Hunting Aerosurveys Ltd. in 1956 and mapped from these photos by the Falkland Islands Dependencies Survey (FIDS). Named by the United Kingdom Antarctic Place-Names Committee (UK-APC) in 1959 after Mr Trundle, a character in Charles Dickens' Pickwick Papers.

See also 
 List of Antarctic and sub-Antarctic islands

Islands of the Biscoe Islands